Esakiozephyrus bieti, the Indian purple hairstreak, is a small butterfly found in India that belongs to the lycaenids or blues family.

Taxonomy
The butterfly was previously classified as Thecla bieti de Nicéville.

Range
The butterfly occurs in India from Kulu to Garhwal, Sikkim to Bhutan. It is also found in China, Tibet, and north west Yunnan.

Status
In 1932 William Harry Evans described the species as rare and very rare in Kumaon.

Etymology
Charles Oberthür dedicated the species to missionary and naturalist Félix Biet.

See also
List of butterflies of India (Lycaenidae)

Cited references

References
  
 
 

Esakiozephyrus
Butterflies of Asia